Jürgen Baumgärtner (born 24 April 1973) is a German politician from the Christian Social Union of Bavaria and a former lieutenant colonel. He is a member of the Landtag of Bavaria since 2013. Since 2018 he is the chairman of the working group for construction, housing and transportation of the Christian Social Union of Bavaria at the Bavarian parliament. Furthermore he is the district chairman of the Frankenwald-CSU since 2010.

From his first election to the Landtag of Bavaria in 2013 he has been a member of the committee for economy, media, infrastructure, construction and transportation, energy and technology as well as of the committee for health and human services until the end of the legislative period in 2018. After his re-election in October 2018 he became the chairman of the working group for construction, housing and transportation of the Christian Social Union of Bavaria at the Bavarian parliament. He is the representative of the districts of Kronach and Lichtenfels in Upper Franconia, northern Bavaria, and a member of the district assembly of Kronach.

On April 6, 2020 it was announced that he will become the Chief Executive Officer of a municipal enterprise forming the University of Kronach, named Lucas-Cranach-Campus referring to the famous painter Lucas Cranach the Elder who was born in Kronach.

In addition to his work at the parliament he is the chairman of the Frankenwaldgruppe, a local water supplier. Furthermore he serves on the board of directors of the hospital Helios Frankenwaldklinik Kronach.

References

1973 births
Living people
Christian Social Union in Bavaria politicians
Members of the Landtag of Bavaria